The Pipeline Coastal Park is an area of coastal vegetation in Amanzimtoti, Durban, South Africa. It is an elongated strip of land bordering the Indian Ocean. Plants found here include the Mimusops caffra, Strelitzia nicolai and Brachylaena discolor.

Gallery

External links
 Pipeline Coastal Park, safarinow.com

Protected areas of KwaZulu-Natal
Nature reserves in South Africa